Amara californica is a species of black coloured beetle of the genus Amara in the family Carabidae.

Subspecies
There are two subspecies of A. californica:
Amara californica californica Dejean, 1828
Amara californica costaricensis (Bates, 1878)

References

californica
Beetles described in 1828
Taxa named by Pierre François Marie Auguste Dejean